The Borgu Local Government Area is an administrative region in Niger State, Nigeria, one of 25 Local Government Areas (LGAs) in that state, with headquarters in the town of New Bussa.
The postal code is 913.
The Borgu LGA was formerly part of Kwara State, but on 27 August 1991 it was transferred to Niger State.

The LGA has the same extent as the Borgu Emirate, a Nigerian traditional state.
It contains part of the Borgu Game Reserve, a section of the Kainji National Park.

In the 1991 census Borgu LGA had a total population of 110,000, with a mixed ethnic population as follows:
Fulani 30,000
Bokobaru 25,000
Busa 15,000
Hausa 10,000
kambari (Acipu) 8,000
Yoruba 7,000
Laru 5,000
Hun-Saare 3,000
Nupe 2,000
Lopa 2,000
Igbo 1,000
Others 2,000

References

Local Government Areas in Niger State